Clubs  is one of the four suits of playing cards in the standard French deck. It corresponds to the suit of Acorns in a German deck .

Its original French name is Trèfle which means "clover" and the card symbol depicts a three-leafed clover leaf. The Italian name is Fiori ("flower"). The English name "Clubs" is derived from the suit of Bastoni (batons) in Italian-Spanish suited cards.

In Germany, this suit is known as Kreuz ("cross"), especially in the International Skat Regulations. In Austria, by contrast, it is almost exclusively called Treff, a reference to the French name, especially in the game of Bridge, where French names generally predominate, for example Cœur is used instead of Herz.

In Skat and Doppelkopf, Clubs are the highest-ranked suit (whereas Diamonds/Bells are the trump suit in Doppelkopf). In Bridge, Clubs are the lowest suit.

Characteristics 

The symbol for the suit of Clubs depicts a very stylised three-leaf clover with its stalk oriented downwards.

Generally the suit of Clubs is black in colour. However, the suit may also be green, for example as sometimes used in Bridge (where it is one of the two minor suits, along with Diamonds).

The gallery below shows a suit of Clubs from a French suited deck of 52 cards. Not shown is the Knight of Clubs used in tarot card games:

Four-colour packs 

Four-colour packs are sometimes used in tournaments or online. In four-colour packs, clubs may be:
 green  in American Bridge and Poker, English Poker, French and Swiss four-colour decks,
 black  in German Skat packs,
 blue  in English Bridge and some American packs or
 pink  in some other four-colour packs.

Coding 
The symbol ♣ is already in the CP437 and thus also part of Windows WGL4. In Unicode a black ♣ and a white ♧ Club symbol are defined:

References

Literature 
 
 

Card suits